Hellinsia aruna is a moth of the family Pterophoridae. It is found in Nepal.

The wingspan is 16–20 mm. The forewings are yellowish-grey with dark scales. Adults have been recorded from April to August.

References

Moths described in 1991
aruna
Moths of Asia